The Roof is a 1933 British crime film directed by George A. Cooper and starring Leslie Perrins, Judy Gunn, Russell Thorndike and Michael Hogan. It was shot at Twickenham Studios in London as a quota quickie for release by RKO Pictures. The film's sets were designed by Twickenham's resident art director James A. Carter. It was based on the novel of the same title by David Whitelaw.

Cast
 Leslie Perrins as Inspector Darrow
 Judy Gunn as Carol Foster
 Russell Thorndike as Clive Bristow
 Michael Hogan as Samuel Morton
 Ivor Barnard as Arthur Stannard
 Eliot Makeham as John Rutherford
 Barbara Everest as Mrs Foster
 George Zucco as James Renton
 Leo Britt - Tony Freyne
 D. J. Williams as Fritz Klein
 Hector Abbas as Otto Bebberg
 Cyril Smith as McNair

References

Bibliography
 Chibnall, Steve. Quota Quickies: The Birth of the British 'B' Film. British Film Institute, 2007.
 Low, Rachael. Filmmaking in 1930s Britain. George Allen & Unwin, 1985.
 Wood, Linda. British Films, 1927-1939. British Film Institute, 1986.

External links

1933 films
1933 crime films
1930s English-language films
Films directed by George A. Cooper
Films shot at Twickenham Film Studios
British black-and-white films
British crime films
1930s British films
RKO Pictures films
Quota quickies
Films based on British novels